Last of the Summer Wine's twenty-fourth series aired on BBC One. All of the episodes were written by Roy Clarke and produced and directed by Alan J. W. Bell.

Outline
The trio in this series consisted of:

First appearances

Entwistle (2002–2010)
Alvin Smedley (2003–2010)
Miss Davenport (2003–2010)

Returning this series

Nora Batty (1973–2001, 2003–2008)

Last appearances

Edie Pegden (1986–2003)

List of episodes

Christmas Special (2002)

Regular series

DVD release
The box set for series twenty four was released by Universal Playback in September 2014, mislabelled as a box set for series 25 & 26.

References

Last of the Summer Wine series
2003 British television seasons